Jorge Chávez (Callao) was a Peruvian football club, located in the city of Callao. The club was founded with the name of club Jorge Chávez in honor to the Peruvian aviator Jorge Chávez and played in Primera Division Peruana from 1912 until 1921, and later in 1948 and in 1950 it was their last appearance.

Honours

National
Peruvian Primera División: 0
Runner-up (1): 1918

Peruvian Segunda División: 2
Winners (2): 1947, 1949

Regional
Liga Regional de Lima y Callao:
Winners (1): 1943

Liga Provincial del Callao:
Runner-up (2): 1933, 1938

See also
List of football clubs in Peru
Peruvian football league system

External links
 La difusión del fútbol en Lima (Spanish)
 RSSSF - Peru - List of Champions
 Peruvian football seasons

Football clubs in Lima